Edwin Mahiai (Mahi) Copp Beamer (December 5, 1928 – July 14, 2017) was a tenor falsetto singer, composer and hula dancer of Hawaiian ancestry.  He was born in Honolulu in the Territory of Hawaii and is the grandson of Helen Desha Beamer. His father, Milton Hoolulu Desha Beamer Sr. was her son. Mahi's mother was Mildred Kaaloehukaiopuaena Copp Beamer. In 2006, Mahi Beamer was inducted into the Hawaiian Music Hall of Fame. He was named a "Living Treasure of Hawaii" in 2008 by the Honpa Hongwanji Mission of Hawaii, which has been recognizing Hawaii's treasures since 1976. He received the 1992 State of Hawaii Recognition Award for his musical contributions to the state and for perpetuating his grandmother's music. Beamer was the 1993 recipient of the David Malo award presented by Rotary International for his cultural contributions.

Beamer is a 1946 graduate of Kamehameha Schools and went on to continue his musical education at University of California, Santa Barbara and Juilliard School of Music. He is a cousin to Winona Beamer and once toured North America with Winona and her son Keola performing the ancient Hawaiian form of the hula.
He served in the United States Army during the post-World War II years at Schofield Barracks at Wahiawa on the island of Oahu, where he played classical piano and the glockenspiel. His civilian music career got its start with a three-year stint singing at the Queen's Surf in Waikiki. In 1959, Beamer had an uncredited part as a singer in the Columbia Pictures movie Forbidden Island, which starred Jon Hall and was filmed on location in Hawaii. Beamer performed at Carnegie Hall in New York City, and for thirteen years was a featured performer of Nalani Kele's Polynesian Review at the Stardust Resort and Casino in Paradise, Nevada. Beamer performed at numerous venues in his home state of Hawaii, and recorded many of his grandmother's compositions. The Hawai'i Academy of Recording Arts gave Beamer its Lifetime Achievement Award in 1991.

Mahi Beamer died at Kuakini Medical Center in Honolulu on July 14, 2017, at the age of 88.

Singles discography (partial list)
Source:  allmusic

"Halehuki"
"He Makana"
"Kahuli-Aku Kahuli-Mai" (arranger)
"Kawohikukapulani"
"Ke Ali'i Hulu Mamo"
"Keawaiki Hula"
"Ke Ha'a la Puna"

"Kimo Hula" (composer, along with Helen Desha Beamer)
"Kinue"
"Lei 'Ilima"
"Mahai'ula"
"Moanike' ala"
"Na Hala O Naue"

"Nohili" (also composer)
"Paniau"
"Pua Mae'ole"
"Pua Malihini"
"Pu'uwa'awa'a (Pihanakalani)"

Family tree

References

1928 births
2017 deaths
Hawaiian songwriters
Kamehameha Schools alumni
Native Hawaiian musicians
People from Oahu
Tenors